NUS Press is an academic press in Singapore. It traces its origins to the Singapore University Press, which the University of Singapore established in 1971 as its publishing arm. The press specialises in books and journals that deal with topics on the social sciences and humanities in Asia.

History

In 1954, the University of Malaya (founded in 1949) established a Publishing Committee to oversee manage academic publishing in Malaya. The Publishing Committee operated with the assistance of the Oxford University Press, which carried out editing and other back-end work for academic articles the Committee sent to the press for publishing. The committee comprised the university's vice chancellor as its chairman, a librarian, representatives from the University Council and Senate, the Education Ministry, and a representative from the OUP.

In 1959, the University of Malaya split into two autonomous units, with one division in Kuala Lumpur and the other in Singapore. These divisions eventually split in 1962 to become the University of Malaya and the University of Singapore. Despite the split, the two national universities continued to share a publishing arm. By this time, the Publishing Committee had become a limited company called the University of Malay Press (UM Press).  The UM Press continued its collaboration with the OUP until 1969. It was not until 1971 that the University of Singapore established its own publishing arm in the Singapore University Press.

Main Subject Areas
 Anthropology
 Archaeology
 Architecture and Building
 Business
 Economics
 Geography
 History
 Language Learning
 Literature & Linguistics
 Medicine & Life Sciences
 Memoirs
 Politics and International Relations
 Religion
 Sociology
 Visual Arts & Visual Culture

Book Series
 Asian Studies Association of Australia (ASAA) - Southeast Asia Publications Series
 Kyoto CSEAS Series on Asian Studies
 Challenges of Agrarian Transition in Southeast Asia
 History of Medicine in Southeast Asia
 IRASEC Studies of Contemporary Southeast Asia
 Southeast Asian Classic Reprints
 Studies in Asian Security

Journals
Asian Bioethics Review
China: An International Journal 
The Journal of Burma Studies
The Heritage Journal

References

External links
 NUS Press

National University of Singapore
University presses of Singapore
Book publishing companies of Singapore
Publishing companies established in 1971